Lizeriinae is a subfamily of the family Aphididae.

References

Aphididae
Hemiptera subfamilies